Anjirak or Anjirk may refer to:

Afghanistan
 Anjirak (Afghanistan), a mountain pass

Iran

Fars Province
 Anjirak, Fars, a village in Estahban County

Hormozgan Province
 Anjirak, Hormozgan

Kerman Province
 Anjirak, Anbarabad
 Anjirak, Baft
 Anjirak, Narmashir

Kermanshah Province
 Anjirak, Eslamabad-e Gharb
 Anjirak, Howmeh-ye Jonubi, Eslamabad-e Gharb County
 Anjirak, Harsin
 Anjirak, Kermanshah

Khuzestan Province
 Anjirak, Khuzestan

Markazi Province
 Anjirak, Markazi

Sistan and Baluchestan Province
 Anjirak (1), Irandegan, a village in Khash County
 Anjirak (2), Irandegan, a village in Khash County
 Anjirak, Mehrestan, a village in Mehrestan County

Yazd Province
 Anjirak, Yazd